Willie Jackson may refer to:

Willie Jackson (American football) (born 1971), former NFL wide receiver
Willie Jackson (basketball) (born 1962), American former basketball player
Willie Jackson (footballer) (1900–1986), Scottish footballer
Willie Jackson (politician) (born 1961), New Zealand broadcaster and Member of Parliament
New Orleans Willie Jackson, 1920s New Orleans Jazz Singer
William Kilgour "Willie" Jackson (1871–1955), Scottish curler

See also
William Jackson (disambiguation)
Will Jackson (disambiguation)
Bill Jackson (disambiguation)